Peter McLean (6 May 1941 – 4 April 2009) was an Australian rules footballer who played for Melbourne and Carlton in the Victorian Football League (VFL) during the 1960s.

A utility player, McLean was a reserve in Melbourne's 1964 VFL Grand Final win over Collingwood which gave him the perfect end to his debut year. In 1966 he reunited with his former coach Ron Barassi at Carlton and was a member of their 1968 premiership side. It would be his final league season and he thus earned the distinction of being a premiership player in his first and last season, in both cases as a reserve.

References

External links

Blueseum profile
Demon Wiki profile

1941 births
Melbourne Football Club players
Carlton Football Club players
Carlton Football Club Premiership players
Old Melburnians Football Club players
Australian rules footballers from Victoria (Australia)
2009 deaths
Melbourne Football Club Premiership players
Two-time VFL/AFL Premiership players